Sir Michael John Fordham, (born 21 December 1964), styled The Hon. Mr Justice Fordham, is a judge of the High Court of England and Wales assigned to the King's Bench Division. He was appointed as a Justice of the High Court on 13 January 2020.

Education
Fordham was educated at Spalding Grammar School between 1976 and 1983. He went on to study law at Hertford College, Oxford having been awarded a place through the Tanner Scheme. After achieving a First class degree, he stayed on at Oxford until 1987 to undertake a Bachelor of Civil Law (BCL). In 1988 he obtained a Master of Laws (LLM) at the University of Virginia.

Career
Fordham was called to the bar in 1990 by Gray's Inn, and by 2006 had been appointed a Queen's Counsel. Four years later he became a Civil Recorder, and in 2012, a Criminal Recorder. He was appointed Deputy Judge of the Upper Tribunal, sitting for six years until 2018. He was authorised under s9(1) to sit as a Deputy High Court Judge in 2013.

During his career as a barrister spanning 1990 to 2020, he specialised (inter alia) in public law, administrative law, immigration and asylum, health and human rights, arguing more than 50 cases in the Administrative Court, the House of Lords and the Supreme Court.

Fordham is a Bencher of Gray's Inn where he serves as Master of Students.

Cases argued
The following are among the cases argued by Fordham during his career as a barrister:

R (Miller) v The Prime Minister and Cherry v Advocate General for Scotland
Lauzika, R (On the Application of) v Secretary of State for the Home Department [2018] EWHC 1045 (Admin)
Secretary of State for the Home Department v ZAT and Ors [2016] EWCA Civ 810
Pinochet, In re [1999] UKHL 1; [2000] 1 AC 119; [1999] 1 All ER 577; [1999] 2 WLR 272
Keyu & Others v Secretary of State for Foreign and Commonwealth Affairs & Anr [2014] EWCA Civ 312
R (March) v Secretary of State for Health [2010] EWHC 765 (Admin)
R v Parliamentary Commissioner for Standards, ex p Al-Fayed [1998]

Author
As a legal practitioner specialising in judicial review, Fordham has authored no less than seven editions of his Judicial Review Handbook.
In the foreword to the 5th Edition, Lord Woolf paid tribute to the author, saying that the handbook was "an institution for those who practise public law".

Bibliography

References

1964 births
Knights Bachelor
Living people
Alumni of Hertford College, Oxford
People educated at Spalding Grammar School
Queen's Bench Division judges
English legal writers